The Sassafras is a C-Class, 180 ft, seagoing buoy tender constructed for the USCG by Marine Iron & Shipbuilding Corp. of Duluth, Minnesota.  The Sass was one of 39 tenders commissioned for duties that would include aids-to-navigation, ice breaking, search-and-rescue, fire fighting, law enforcement, providing fuel and potable water, and assistance to the National Oceanographic and Seismographic Survey.

History

 

1943	- 16 Aug. Keel laid at Duluth Minnesota.

1943      - 05 Oct.  Launched Superior Bay.

1944	- 23 May. Commissioned as USCGC Sassafras (WAGL-401).

1945	- 15 Apr. Homeported San Francisco, California.

1946	- 23 Aug. Left San Francisco for new homeport of Honolulu, Hawaii.

1946-47   - Assisted the Seventh Fleet involved in wartime operations in the Philippines.

1947	- 22 Aug. Left Honolulu for new homeport of Cape May, New Jersey.

1949	- Assisted  USCGC Eastwind (WAGB-279) after she was severely damaged in a collision with M.V. Gulfstream on 19 January 1949 off Cape May. New Jersey.

1957	- 4 Sep. Assisted after a mid-air collision between two USAF F-89 aircraft in Delaware Bay.

1965	- Hull Classification Symbol changed to WLB.

1967      - On 30 April 1967 Sassafras rescued five from FV Mockingbird, which sank 130 mi SE of New York City.

1969	- 12 Jan. Grounded on a pinnacle in the Hudson River, north of Bear Mountain Bridge; she was re-floated four days later.

1977-78	- Underwent a "major renovation" at the Coast Guard Yard.  The "major renovation" program was conducted on the following 180-foot tenders between 1974-1979: Sedge, Bramble, Ironwood, Mariposa, Acacia, Sweetbrier, Hornbeam, Spar, Sassafras, Sundew, Firebush, and Woodrush.  This renovation involved the complete removal and overhaul of all mechanical systems including the main engines and the propulsion switchboard.  A bow thruster was also added.  The tenders were then recabled, repiped, and all habitability spaces were renovated and the forward hold was redesigned to increase berthing space.

1978	- Moved homeport to Governors Island, New York.

1981	- Returned to Honolulu, Hawaii.

1986	- 5 Dec. Rescued two people from the sailboat Joie de Mar, which was disabled 550 miles southwest of Honolulu, Hawaii.

1989	- Feb. Assisted after United Airlines Flight 811 crash off Hawaii.

1989-90   - MCI Ship Yard in Bellingham, Washington.  Major renovations and replacement of Main Diesel Engine's and major auxiliary systems during a 7-month yard period. Removing the Cooper-Bessemer Engines and replacing with General Motors Diesel plant.

1990   - Rescued 28 crewmen from sinking Greek freighter (Vulca) 800 miles northeast of Hawaii.

2003	- Decommissioned after 59 years of service.  Transferred to the Federal Republic of Nigeria, to continue her proud naval history as the Nigerian Naval Ship Obula.

The Sassafras was named after a type of tree, most famous for flavoring root beer.  All of the 180s were named after trees, shrubs, or flowers. This was a continuation of the longstanding Lighthouse Service practice of naming tenders after foliage found in the tender’s intended area of operations. For the 180s, however, there was no particular area of operations envisioned for individual vessels.

References and links
USCG Historian Factsheet - CGC Sassafras
Historical Context and Statement of Significance Cactus, Mesquite, and Basswood Classes United States Coast Guard 180-foot Buoy Tenders
Photo history of USCG buoy tenders by the Coast Guard Historian's Office
WWII Construction Records U.S. Coast Guard Cutters (WAG, WPG, WAGL, WYT) 
Wess Wessling's U.S. Coast Guard Patch Archive
A story of the Eastwind
Scheina, Robert L., 1990. U.S. Coast Guard Cutter and Craft 1946-1990. Naval Institute Press, Annapolis, Maryland. United States Coast Guard.
Tragedy Stalks The Sea: An Account of The Eastwind Disaster. U.S. Coast Guard Magazine, March 1949. Accessed 13 DEC 2021

References

External links

Historic American Engineering Record in Guam
Iris-class seagoing buoy tenders
1943 ships
Ships built in Duluth, Minnesota
Ships of the Nigerian Navy
Ships transferred from the United States Coast Guard to the Nigerian Navy